The Bergamaschi C-1 and C-2 were Italian single-engined light trainers built by Cantieri Aeronautici Bergamaschi for the Bergamo flying school.

Design and development
During the 1920s the flying school at Bergamo developed a light training aircraft. Original for use in its own flying school it was also for sale to other flying schools and private individuals. A new company Cantieri Aeronautici Bergamaschi was established to build the aircraft.

Variants
C-1 was an unequal-span biplane of conventional wood and fabric construction. The fuselage structure included an open cockpit for the pilot just aft of the upper wing trailing edge. It had a fixed tailskid type landing gear. Powered by a Hispano-Suiza inline engine.
C-2 was generally similar differing only in having two seats.

Specifications (C-2)

References

Further reading

1920s Italian civil trainer aircraft